Maksim Tank (Belarusian: Максiм Танк, Russian: Максим Танк, real name Jaŭhien Skurko; 17 September 1912 – 7 August 1995) was a Belarusian Soviet poet, journalist and translator.

Childhood and activism in West Belarus

Jaŭhien Skurko was born into a wealthy peasant family in the village Piĺkaŭščyna, now in Myadzyel District, Minsk Oblast, Belarus. In 1914, his family went to Moscow as refugees from the approaching First World War and lived there till 1922.

Because of the hunger in Russia, the family returned to its home village, which by then became part of the Second Polish Republic.

In 1928, Skurko joined an underground communist youth organization in his school in Radashkovichy. Despite good performance in the school, in 1929 he was expelled together with several other pupils for participating in a protest against closure of Belarusian schools by the Polish authorities. He was also expelled from his following school in Wilno for participation in student protests.

In early 1930s, Jaŭhien Skurko participated in the Belarusian underground communist activism, writing for Belarusian and Polish underground publications. In 1932, he was arrested and placed in the Lukiškės Prison in Wilno.

In late 1932, he illegally crossed the border with the Soviet Union and joined Belarusian underground group in Minsk. He was eventually arrested by the Soviet authorities, interrogated by the NKVD and deported to Poland. After his return, he was an activist of the illegal youth branch of the Communist Party of West Belarus in Wilno and Navahrudak. He was several times arrested and spent a total of two years in prison.

In 1936, Skurko was admitted into the underground Communist Party of West Belarus.

Career in the USSR

After the annexation of West Belarus by the Soviet Union, Skurko worked as a culture journalist and as an education administrator in Vilejka.

After the beginning of the war, Skurko was evacuated to Saratov and then returned to the Bryansk Front to work as a reporter for several Soviet publications.

In 1945 – 1948, Skurko worked as editor at the satirical magazine Vozhyk. From 1948 to 1966, he was editor in chief of the major Belarusian literature magazine Polymia.

Since the late 1940s, Skurko held various senior positions in the Belarusian Soviet legislative system. In 1947–1971 he was member of the Supreme Soviet of Belarus; of which he was chairman in 1963–1971. In 1969 – 1989 he was member of the Supreme Soviet of the USSR.

After Belarus regained independence, Maksim Tank admitted being supporter of the Belarusian White, Red and White flag and opposed the controversial referendum to change the national symbols of Belarus organized by president Alexander Lukashenko.

Maksim Tank died in Minsk in August 1995.

Selected works

Collections of verses:
 On Stages (1936)
 The Cranberry Colour (1937)
 Under the Mast (1938)
 Sharpen the Arms, Through the Fiery Horizon (both 1945)
 In Order to Know (1948)
 On the Stone, Iron and Gold (1951)
 On the Road (1954)
 The Lightning Track (1957)
 My Daily Bread (1962)
 The Gulp of Water (1964)
 Listen, the Spring is Coming (1990)
 My Arch (1994)

Poems:
 Narach (1937)
 Yanuk Sialiba (1942)

Memory

The Maksim Tank Belarusian State Pedagogical University in Minsk was renamed after Maksim Tank in 1995.

There is a monument to Maksim Tank in Miadziel and a street named after him in Minsk.

Awards
 People's Poet of Belarus, 1968
 Hero of Socialist Labour, 1974
 Four-time laureate of the Order of Lenin
 Order of the October Revolution
 other Soviet and Polish awards

References

External links
Танк Максим. warheroes.ru (in Russian)
Максим Танк (Евгений Иванович Скурко). Belarusian Academy of Science. bas-net.by (in Russian)

1912 births
1995 deaths
People from Myadzyel District
People from Vileysky Uyezd
Communist Party of the Soviet Union members
Eighth convocation members of the Soviet of Nationalities
Ninth convocation members of the Soviet of Nationalities
Tenth convocation members of the Soviet of Nationalities
Eleventh convocation members of the Soviet of Nationalities
Prisoners and detainees of Poland
Communist Party of Western Belorussia politicians
Members of the Supreme Council of Belarus
Soviet emigrants to Poland
20th-century Belarusian poets
Belarusian male poets
Belarusian journalists
Soviet poets
Soviet male writers
20th-century male writers
Heroes of Socialist Labour
Officers of the Order of Polonia Restituta
Recipients of the Order of Merit of the Republic of Poland
20th-century journalists